Mascula was an ancient Roman colonia in Numidia. It is called Khenchela in modern Algeria.

History

The fresh location was chosen by Roman legionaries to retire as veterans.

Mascula was built under Trajan and was garrisoned by the "7th company of Lusitanians". It was a castrum (with a nearby vicus) on the military road, that connected Theveste with Sitifis and that followed the slopes of the Aures mountains. Mascula was connected with the fortifications of Tinfadi, Vegesela, Claudi and Tliamugas. Mascula was the most important of these forts from a strategic point of view, because controlled the numidian access to the Sahara.

Mascula in the fourth century was at the center of the Donatism controversy, and there are beautiful mosaics discovered from those years There are even some Roman baths from the late third century, still efficiently working after recent restoration.

Mascula was even one of the centers of Romano-berber resistance against the Arabs, under queen Kahina. It seems that was renamed -after the Moslem conquest- with the name of one of the daughters of Kahina: Khenchela (meaning "angel" in berber).

Notes

Bibliography
 Dunbabin, Katherine. Mosaics of the Greek and Roman World.Publisher Cambridge University Press. Cambridge, 1999   
 Graham Alexander. Roman Africa: An Outline of the History of the Roman Occupation of North Africa, Based Chiefly Upon Inscriptions and Monumental Remains in that Country. Publisher Longmans, Green, and Company. London,1902 (University of California)

See also

 Cirta
 Lambaesis
 Theveste 
 Sitifis 
 Milevum

Archaeological sites in Algeria
Roman towns and cities in Algeria
Ancient Berber cities
Former populated places in Algeria
Populated places established in the 2nd century
2nd-century establishments